Mohammed Sheikh Eldin (born 19 March 1985) is a Sudanese football striker who plays for Al-Nil Al-Hasahesa and the Sudan national football team.

References

External links

1985 births
Living people
Association football forwards
Sudanese footballers
Sudan international footballers
2012 Africa Cup of Nations players
Place of birth missing (living people)
21st-century Sudanese people